Sophia Moreau (born 1972) is a Canadian philosopher and Professor of Law and Philosophy at the University of Toronto.
She is known for her works on inequality and discrimination.

Books
 Faces of Inequality: A Theory of Wrongful Discrimination, Oxford University Press 2020

References

21st-century Canadian philosophers
Philosophy academics
Living people
Academic staff of the University of Toronto
Political philosophers
Canadian women philosophers
1972 births